Rose Terrace is a housing unit in downtown Evansville, Indiana.  The Prairie School style block was designed by the architectural firm Shopbell & Company and built in 1910 as part of a trend to reform crowded living conditions for the working class.

It was listed on the National Register of Historic Places in 1982.

References

Residential buildings in Indiana
Working-class culture in Indiana
Residential buildings on the National Register of Historic Places in Indiana
Prairie School architecture in Indiana
Residential buildings completed in 1910
National Register of Historic Places in Evansville, Indiana
Residential buildings in Evansville, Indiana